Merve Çoban (born 25 January 1993) is a Turkish karateka. She won the bronze medal in the 61 kg event at the 2020 Summer Olympics in Tokyo, Japan. She is also a gold medalist and a two-time silver medalist in the women's kumite 61 kg event at the European Karate Championships.

She won the gold medal in the kumite 68 kg event at the 2013 Islamic Solidarity Games held in Palembang, Indonesia. She also represented her country at the European Games in 2015 and in 2019 and she won a medal on both occasions.

Career 
She won the silver medal in the women's kumite 61 kg event at the 2015 European Games held in Baku, Azerbaijan. At the 2019 European Games in Minsk, Belarus, she won one of the bronze medals in the women's kumite 61 kg event.

In 2019, she won the gold medal in the women's kumite 61 kg event at the European Karate Championships held in Guadalajara, Spain. She also won the silver medal in the women's team kumite event.

She represented Turkey at the 2020 Summer Olympics in karate. She won one of the bronze medals in the women's 61 kg event.

Achievements

References

External links 
 

1993 births
Living people
Place of birth missing (living people)
Turkish female karateka
Karateka at the 2015 European Games
Karateka at the 2019 European Games
European Games medalists in karate
European Games silver medalists for Turkey
European Games bronze medalists for Turkey
Islamic Solidarity Games medalists in karate
Islamic Solidarity Games competitors for Turkey
Karateka at the 2020 Summer Olympics
Olympic karateka of Turkey
Medalists at the 2020 Summer Olympics
Olympic medalists in karate
Olympic bronze medalists for Turkey
21st-century Turkish women